Christy O'Sullivan (born 27 November 1948) is a former Irish Fianna Fáil politician. He was a Teachta Dála (TD) for the Cork South-West constituency from 2007 to 2011.

From Clonakilty in County Cork, O'Sullivan first stood for public office at the 1999 local elections, when he stood as Independent in the Skibbereen local electoral area and won a seat on Cork County Council. He contested the 2002 general election in Cork South-West as an independent, when he won over 10% of the votes but was not elected.

He was re-elected to the County Council at the 2004 local elections, and in January 2007 he joined Fianna Fáil, and was imposed as a  Fianna Fáil candidate for the 2007 general election, without a selection conference.  His popularity as a local councillor was hoped to strengthen the party's hopes of retaining the two seats which it had won in the three-seat constituency in 2002, and O'Sullivan was seen as a strong candidate to succeed Joe Walsh, who was retiring after 30 years in Dáil Éireann.

The strategy partly worked. Fianna Fáil increased its share of the vote, with O'Sullivan topping the poll, and he was the first candidate to win a seat.  However, his colleague Denis O'Donovan, who had won a seat from Fine Gael in 2002, was defeated after just one term in the Dáil.

Under the Local Government Act 2001, O'Sullivan vacated his council seat when elected to the Dáil. His son Christopher was then co-opted to the County Council in his place.

He was arrested on suspicion of drink driving on 2 June 2008, he has apologised after failing a breath test near Clonakilty. On 4 November 2008, he was banned for driving for 1 year and fined €300 after pleading guilty to a charge of drink driving.

He lost his seat at the 2011 general election. His son Christopher O'Sullivan was elected as a TD for Cork South-West in at the 2020 general election.

See also 
 Families in the Oireachtas

References

 

1948 births
Living people
Fianna Fáil TDs
Independent politicians in Ireland
Local councillors in County Cork
Members of the 30th Dáil